is a Japanese anime television series inspired by the works of Jules Verne, particularly Twenty Thousand Leagues Under the Sea and the exploits of Captain Nemo. The series was created by NHK, Toho and Korad, from a concept of Hayao Miyazaki, and directed by Hideaki Anno of Gainax.

The series follows a young inventor named Jean and a former circus performer named Nadia, who wishes to return to her home in Africa, but soon discovers a secret hidden within her pendant that leads her off to adventure. 

In its original Japanese broadcast, it aired from 1990 to 1991, running for 39 episodes, and was distributed by ADV Films in the United States. ADV's Anime Network has broadcast the series in the United States. Following the 2009 closure of ADV, Sentai Filmworks has re-licensed the anime series, and it was re-released on Blu-ray and DVD in March 2014. GKIDS announced on April 20, 2022 that they have licensed the anime and released it on home video with a new 4K restoration on August 2, 2022.

Plot

Set in an alternate universe 1889, the series centers on Nadia, a 14-year-old girl of unknown origins, and Jean, a young, warm-hearted French inventor. Early in the story, the two protagonists are chased by Grandis Granva, Sanson, and Hanson, a group of jewel thieves who pursue Nadia for the blue jeweled pendant she possesses named the Blue Water. After being rescued by Captain Nemo and his submarine, the Nautilus, the jewel thieves and the young protagonists join forces and participate in the struggle against the Neo-Atlantean forces, who seek to dominate the world.

In the process, Nadia and Jean save the world from violent domination by the Neo-Atlantean forces led by Gargoyle, explore worldly mysteries and the powers of the Blue Water, uncover Nadia's hidden family ties, and ultimately discover the secret origins of Nadia.

Production
This series' origins date to the mid-1970s when Hayao Miyazaki was hired by Toho to develop a television series. One of these concepts was "Around the World in 80 days by Sea" (adapted from Jules Verne's Twenty Thousand Leagues Under the Sea), in which two orphan children pursued by villains team up with Captain Nemo and the Nautilus. It was never produced, but Toho retained the rights for the story outline, while Miyazaki reused elements from his original concept in later projects like Future Boy Conan and Castle in the Sky.

Gainax's initial involvement with the project occurred during an internal power struggle within the company. During a pitch with NHK, Group TAC requested character designs and settings. Hiroaki Inoue provided character designs and storyboards for the pitch that were provided by Yoshiyuki Sadamoto and Mahiro Maeda working in secret. After the conclusion of the pitch NHK chose to proceed with Inoue's Nadia presentation. However the estimated cost of producing the show would cause Gainax to lose money. After a meeting at NHK where senior Gainax staff demanded Inoue be removed from the project or else they would withdraw, Inoue left the company. Sadamoto was originally assigned to be director but eventually dropped out, preferring to concentrate on design and animation. Hideaki Anno was chosen as his replacement. The series contains references and in-jokes to other anime works including Space Battleship Yamato, Macross and Time Bokan. Portions of the infamous "island" episodes of the series were animated in Korea.

At the completion of the series, Gainax had lost ¥80 million on the project and had no rights to the series itself. However, they were allowed rights to produce a video game of the series, which would set record earnings for the company. During production of the series, the company was also involved in other works to offset the losses; however, other issues arose surrounding those projects which highlighted several issues within the company. Group TAC later requested Gainax produce a Nadia movie and provided a ¥50 million advance. Hideaki Anno was convinced to direct it after initially declining the role due to the stress of making the series. Initial production work began and included character designs by Sadamoto. However, the company was unable to develop the project and withdrew. The original advance had brought Gainax's loss on the series down to ¥30 million, but the advance was spent on early production, leaving Gainax unable to repay it until after the success of Neon Genesis Evangelion, in which Gainax returned the advance to Group TAC, minus some costs from Gainax's involvement in providing designs and edited footage from the series.

Media

Anime

The series was broadcast on NHK between April 13, 1990 and April 12, 1991 and consisted of 39 episodes. Two DVD box sets were released in Japan between June 1 and October 1, 2007. 10 Individual discs were released between April 23 and May 21, 2008. A Blu-ray box set consisting of seven discs was released in Japan on November 23, 2011.

Streamline Pictures licensed the series for North America and dubbed 8 episodes into English. They were released as 8 VHS tapes as Nadia between March 1992 and August 1993. Plans for a television broadcast were dropped and no more English episodes were produced by Streamline. Orion Home Video then distributed the same episodes on two VHS tapes in January 1996 as The Secret of Blue Water.

During June 1999, ADV Films announced they had licensed the series for North America. In February 2000 it was announced the series would be released on the new ADV Fansubs range of subtitled releases intended for direct sales via mail order and at conventions. The series was later released on 10 DVDs and VHS between June 19, 2001 and July 16, 2002. The DVDs were later collected the series into 2 box sets, released on May 18, 2004 and July 6, 2004. Sentai Filmworks have announced that they will release the series through digital outlets as well as on DVD and Blu-ray in 2014. The Blu-ray was released March 4, 2014. The series was released in the UK on DVD and Blu-ray by Animatsu Entertainment on June 22, 2015.

A Nadia feature film sequel premiered in Japanese theaters in 1991. The events take place three years after the defeat of Gargoyle and Neo-Atlantis. It was released as Nadia: The Motion Picture on DVD in August 2002 by ADV Films.

Manga
In 1992 a manga adaptation of the series was released under the name The Secret of Blue Water Comic. Although the characters from the series appear in the manga, the stories are not related to the original story and are typically of a comedic nature.

Music
Since the series' first airing in 1990, Toshiba EMI's anime music label, Futureland, released several CDs containing the music of the series; of note are three initial volumes of music, as well as an extended compilation, Hooked on NADIA, which contained more cues than the three original CDs.

ADV Films released the three CD soundtracks of the series (the first time they were issued in North America) and a CD of the movie soundtrack in North America on November 25, 2003.

On August 27, 2012, Starchild released a complete box set of music from the series. The set consists of 11 CDs and a DVD-ROM.

Video games

The first Nadia video game was released in 1991 for the Famicom console. The player controls a cast of characters in a simplistic strategy battle game. Battles are carried out through an RPG style turn-based system. Since the first game's release, six additional games were made. These games include: Fushigi no Umi no Nadia (March 19, 1991, published by Namco), Fushigi no Umi Nadia: The Secret of the Blue Water (March 27, 1992, developed and published by Gainax),Fushigi no Umi Nadia: The Secret of the Blue Water (October 23, 1992, developed and published by Gainax), Fushigi no Umi Nadia: The Secret of the Blue Water (FM Towns), Fushigi no Umi Nadia: The Secret of Blue Water (January 29, 1993, published by Hudson Soft), and Fushigi no Umi no Nadia: Inherit the Blue Water (September 22, 2005, published by Jinx).

Nadia: The Secret of Blue Water made its first Super Robot Wars appearance in Super Robot Wars X (released on March 29, 2018 in Japan, and on April 26 in Southeast Asia (Singapore, Malaysia, Thailand, the Philippines, and Indonesia), published by Bandai Namco).

Reception
The series won a number of awards in the Animage Anime Grand Prix of 1991 including "Best Work". The opening theme Blue Water was voted as best song, while Jean, Sanson and Nemo were respectively voted as fourth, fifth and thirteenth best male character. Six episodes were voted into the top 20 best episodes, including episode 22 which was voted as best episode overall. Nadia herself was voted as best female character, and was also the first character to overtake Nausicaä as the favourite female anime character in Animage's readers poll. In 2001, the series placed 72 in a list of top 100 anime productions decided by Animage.

In The Anime Encyclopedia, Jonathan Clements and Helen McCarthy noted the series made an obvious attempt to reach the mass audience adding that "Very rarely has this approach produced a show of such enduring charm and emotional validity". They recognise that the audience is aware of a "dark and terrible fate" hiding behind the otherwise positive nature of the show's visuals and music. The series is compared to Gainax's later Neon Genesis Evangelion, which made the "lurking darkness" a central theme.

Atlantis controversy

When Disney's Atlantis: The Lost Empire was released in 2001, some viewers noticed that it bore a number of similarities to Nadia, particularly in its character design, setting, and story. The similarities, as noted by viewers in both Japan and America, were strong enough for its production company Gainax to be called to sue for plagiarism. According to Gainax member Yasuhiro Takeda, they only refrained from doing so because the decision belonged to parent companies NHK and Toho. Another Gainax worker, Hiroyuki Yamaga, was quoted in an interview in 2000 as: "We actually tried to get NHK to pick a fight with Disney, but even the National Television Network of Japan didn't dare to mess with Disney and their lawyers. [...] We actually did say that but we wouldn't actually take them to court. We would be so terrified about what they would do to them in return that we wouldn’t dare."

Although Disney never responded formally to those claims, co-director Kirk Wise posted on a Disney animation newsgroup in May 2001, "Never heard of Nadia till it was mentioned in this [newsgroup]. Long after we'd finished production, I might add." He claimed both Atlantis and Nadia were inspired, in part, by the 1870 Jules Verne novel Twenty Thousand Leagues Under the Sea. However, speaking about the clarification, Lee Zion from Anime News Network wrote, "There are too many similarities not connected with 20,000 Leagues for the whole thing to be coincidence." As such, the whole affair ultimately entered popular culture as a convincing case of plagiarism. In 2018, Reuben Baron from Comic Book Resources added to Zion's comment stating, "Verne didn't specifically imagine magic crystal-based technology, something featured in both the Disney movie and the two similar anime. The Verne inspiration also doesn't explain the designs being suspiciously similar to Nadia'''s."

See also
 Atlantis in popular culture
 Twenty Thousand Leagues Under the Sea''

References

External links
 
 
 

1990 Japanese television series debuts
1990 anime television series debuts
1991 Japanese television series endings
1991 anime films
ADV Films
Adventure anime and manga
Anime composed by Shirō Sagisu
Anime films composed by Shirō Sagisu
Atlantis in fiction
Gainax
Group TAC
NHK original programming
Sentai Filmworks
Steampunk anime and manga
Submarines in fiction
Television series set in the 1880s
Television series set in the 1890s
Television shows based on Twenty Thousand Leagues Under the Sea
Works by Hayao Miyazaki